The Waverley Rugby Football and Sporting Club (Waverley RF&SC) was founded in 1971. It is plays in the New South Wales Suburban Rugby Union, the largest rugby union football competition in New South Wales. The club is based in Bondi in the eastern suburbs of Sydney. In 2020, in its 50th season, Waverley's 1st and 3rd Grades reached the grand finals of the Kentwell and Whiddon Cups (1st Gde and 3rd Gdes, 1st Div.) of the NSW Suburban Rugby Union competition.  In 2021, Waverley is celebrating its 50th Anniversary.

Waverley has a proud history in the New South Wales Suburban Rugby Union competition having won numerous Grade and Divisional championships. Waverley has won the 1st Division Championship 4 times (in three of which the club also won the 1st Grade title), 2nd Division 3 times and 3rd Division once since its foundation. Alongside its men's teams, Waverley Rugby has fielded a women's team since 2002.

Club information

Club Name:  Waverley Rugby Football & Sporting Club Inc.
Founded: 1971
Home stadium: Waverley Oval, Bondi Road
President: Craig Askham
1st Grade Coach: Cam Goodhue
Club Captain: Callum Bidmead
Uniform colours: Royal Blue and Gold

Club history
The club was founded in 1971
2016 2nd Division "Club of the Year"
2015 3rd Division "Club of the Year"
1988 1st Division "Most Social" & "Best Host"
1987 1st Division "Most Social" & "Best Host"
1986 2nd Division "Most Social", "Best Host" & "Best Administered"
1985 2nd Division "Most Social" & "Best Host"
1984 1st Division "Most Social" & "Best Host"

Premierships

Total Men's Premierships: 46.
Total Men's Division Club Champions: 9.

2019 Judd Cup (4th Grade) 1st Div. – Premiers
2017 Burke Cup (2nd Grade) 1st Div. – Minor Premiers & Premiers
2016 Winners of 2nd Division Club championship
2016 Stockdale Cup (2nd Grade) 2nd Div. – Minor Premiers & Premiers
2016 Blunt Cup (3rd Grade) 2nd Div. – Minor Premiers & Premiers
2016 NSW Women's "7-a-side" State Champions
2016 Richardson Cup (3rd Grade) 2nd Div. – Minor Premiers
2015 promoted from 3rd Division
2015 Farrant Cup (2nd Grade) 3rd Div. – Premiers
2015 Campbell Cup (3rd Grade) 3rd Div. – Minor Premiers
2014 Farrant Cup (2nd Grade) 3rd Div. – Minor Premiers & Premiers
2013 Campbell Cup (3rd Grade) 3rd Div. – Premiers
2013 Nicholson Cup (4th Grade) 3rd Div. – Premiers
2012 Farrant Cup (2nd Grade) 3rd Div. – Premiers
2010 Richardson Cup (4th Grade) 2nd Div. – Minor Premiers & Premiers (Undefeated)
2009 Richardson Cup (4th Grade) 2nd Div. – Minor Premiers & Premiers (Undefeated)
2008 Stockdale Cup (2nd Grade) 3rd Div. – Minor Premiers
2007 3rd Division Club champions
2007 Clark Cup (1st Grade) 3rd Div. – Minor Premiers & Premiers
2007 Farrant Cup (2nd Grade) 3rd Div. – Minor Premiers
2002 2nd Division Club Champions
2002 Blunt Cup (3rd Grade) 2nd Div. – Premiers
2001 Barraclough Cup (1st Grade) 2nd Div. – Premiers
2000 Richardson Cup (4th Grade) 2nd Div. – Premiers
1998 Judd Cup (4th Grade) 1st Div. – Premiers
1997 Sutherland Cup (5th Grade) 1st Div. – Premiers
1995 Whiddon Cup (3rd Grade) 1st Div. – Premiers
1995 Judd Cup (4th Grade) 1st Div. – Premiers
1994 Judd Cup (4th Grade) 1st Div. – Premiers
1992 1st Division Club Champions
1992 Whiddon Cup (3rd Grade)1st Div. – Minor Premiers & Premiers
1992 Judd Cup (4th Grade) 1st Div. – Minor Premiers & Premiers

1991 1st Division Club Champions
1991 Kentwell Cup (1st Grade) 1st Div. – Minor Premiers & Joint Premiers
1991 Burke Cup (2nd Grade) 1st Div. – Premiers
1991 Whiddon Cup (3rd Grade) 1st Div. – Premiers
1991 Judd Cup (4th Grade) 1st Div. – Minor Premiers & Premiers
1990 1st Division Club Champions
1990 Kentwell Cup (1st Grade) 1st Div. – Minor Premiers & Premiers
1990 Burke Cup (2nd Grade) 1st Div. – Minor Premiers & Premiers
1990 Judd Cup  (4th Grade) 1st Div. – Minor Premiers & Premiers
1989 1st Division Club Champions
1989 Kentwell Cup (1st Grade) 1st Div. – Minor Premiers & Premiers
1989 Judd Cup (4th Grade) 1st Div. – Minor Premiers & Premiers
1989 Sutherland Cup (5th Grade) 1st Div. – Minor Premiers & Premiers
1987 Sutherland Cup (5th Grade) 1st Div. – Minor Premiers & Premiers (Undefeated)
1986 2nd Division Club Champions
1986 Barraclough Cup  (1st Grade) 2nd Div. – Minor Premiers & Premiers
1986 Richardson Cup (4th grade) 2nd Div. – Minor Premiers & Premiers
1986 Sutherland Cup (5th Grade) 2nd Div. – Minor Premiers & Premiers 
1985 Richardson Cup (4th Grade) 2nd Div.– Minor Premiers & Premiers (Undefeated)
1983 Sutherland Cup (5th Grade) 1st Div. – Premiers 
1982 Judd Cup winners (4th Grade) 1st Div. – Minor Premiers & Premiers
1981 Judd Cup winners (4th Grade) 1st Div. – Premiers 
1979 2nd Division Club Champions
1979 Stockdale Cup winners (2nd Grade) 2nd Div. – Minor Premiers & Premiers 
1979 Blunt Cup winners (3rd Grade) 2nd Div. – Minor Premiers & Premiers
1977 Blunt Cup winners (3rd Grade) 2nd Div. – Premiers 
1974 Grose Cup (2nd Grade) 3rd Div."A"– Minor Premiers & Premiers 
1972 Walker Cup (1st Grade) 3rd Div."B" – Minor Premiers & Premiers (Undefeated)

Notes

Life Members

1990 Dr T.V. Hickie & M.N. Sutherland (deceased)
1991 R.P. Eardley (deceased) & D.J Hickie
1992 P.F. Finegan (deceased) & J.M. Finegan
1994 S.F. Finegan
1998 B.P. Heavener
1999 B. Kennedy
2001 T.T. Endemann
2002 R.T. Mohi

2008 D.R. Beaver
2011 A.K. Collingridge
2012 P.A. Baker
2014 M.B.W. Holani & S. Wright
2015 K.L Christie
2017 R.Willoughby
2018 K.R.Brown
2019 G.J.Campbell (OAM)

Players of note
Internationals who began at Waverley 
Owen Finegan –  Australia (56 Caps & 1999 Rugby World Cup Winner)
Sebastian Valech Alonso – Chile (10 Caps)
Emma McBride – Scotland (Women's)
Finn M. Wright – Australian Schoolboys 2017 (2 Caps)
Internationals selected from Waverley
Anita Flannery –  Australia (Women's)
Ruan Sims –  Australia (Women's)
Noella Green –  Australia (Women's)
Internationals who later played at Waverley
Josia Taqiri - Fiji (1 Cap)
Ben R. Evans – Wales (27 Caps)
Eddie Paea – Tonga (3 Caps)

Presidents

1971–73: Dr William R. Deverall
1974–78: Christopher J. Delohery
1979–80: David C. Hawkins
1981: Christopher J. Delohery
1982: Stephen A. Williamson
1983–88: Dr Thomas V. Hickie
1989: Brian P. Heavener
1990: Samuel P. Post
1991–93: Shaun F. Finegan
1994: Brian P. Heavener
1995–97: Patrick P. O'Shea
1998: Brian P. Heavener
1999–2000: Craig J.B. Miller

2001–03: Michael Hassey
2004: Matthew B.W. Holani
2005: Matthew G. Brown
2006: Ruan Sims
2007: Peter Brown
2008–09: Kevin Nagle
2010: Tivoli T. Endemann
2011: James McMillan & Robert Willoughby
2012–13: Robert Willoughby
2014–17: Kenneth R. Brown
2018–20: Edward P.J. Shelton
2021–: Craig G. Askham (Current)

Nearby Clubs
Randwick DRUFC
Eastern Suburbs RUFC
Woollahra Colleagues RFC

References

External links
Waverley Rugby Club, Bondi, Sydney

Rugby union teams in Sydney
Rugby clubs established in 1971
1971 establishments in Australia
Bondi, New South Wales
Waverley, New South Wales